Varco Sabino is a  (municipality) in the Province of Rieti in the Italian region of Latium, located about  northeast of Rome and about  southeast of Rieti.
 
The municipality borders with Ascrea, Castel di Tora, Concerviano, Marcetelli, Paganico Sabino, Pescorocchiano, Petrella Salto and Rocca Sinibalda.

References

External links

Cities and towns in Lazio